Moroccans are the citizens and nationals of the Kingdom of Morocco. The country's population is predominantly composed of Arabs and Berbers (Amazigh). The term also applies more broadly to any people who are of Moroccan nationality, sharing a common culture and identity, as well as those who natively speak Moroccan Arabic or other languages of Morocco.

In addition to the approximately 37 million residents of Morocco, there is a large Moroccan diaspora as part of the wider Arab diaspora. Considerable Moroccan populations can be found in France, Spain, Belgium, Italy, and the Netherlands; with smaller notable concentrations in other Arab states as well as Germany, the United Kingdom, the United States, and Canada.

Ethnic groups 

Moroccans are primarily of Arab and Berber origin as in other neighbouring countries in the Maghreb region. Arabs make up 67% of the population of Morocco, while Berbers make up 31% and Sahrawis make up 2%. Socially, there are two contrasting groups of Moroccans: those living in the cities and those in the rural areas. Among the rural, several classes have formed such as landowners, peasants, and tenant farmers. Moroccans live mainly in the north and west portions of Morocco. However, they prefer living in the more fertile regions near the Mediterranean Sea.

The Arab population of Morocco is a result of the inflow of nomadic Arab tribes from the Arabian Peninsula since the Muslim conquest of the Maghreb in the 7th century with a major wave in the 11th century. The major migration to the region by Arab tribes was in the 11th century when the tribes of Banu Hilal and Banu Sulaym, along with others, were sent by the Fatimids to defeat a Berber rebellion and then settle in the Maghreb. Between the Nile and the Red Sea were Arab tribes expelled from Arabia for their turbulence, Banu Hilal and Banu Sulaym, who often plundered farming areas in the Nile Valley. According to Ibn Khaldun, whole tribes set off with women, children, ancestors, animals and camping equipment. These tribes, who arrived in the region of Morocco around the 12th-13th centuries, and later the Ma'qil in the 14th century, contributed to a more extensive ethnic, genetic, cultural, and linguistic Arabization of Morocco over time, especially beyond the major urban centres and the northern regions which were the main sites of Arabization up to that point.

The Berber population mainly inhabits the mountainous regions of Morocco where some preserve Berber culture, and are split into three groups; Riffians, Shilha and Zayanes, who inhabit the Rif mountains, Anti-Atlas mountains, and Middle Atlas mountains respectively. The Berbers were an amalgamation of Ibero-Maurisian and a minority of Capsian stock blended with a more recent intrusion associated with the Neolithic revolution. Out of these populations, the proto-Berber tribes formed during the late Paleolithic era. The Arabized Berbers who constitute about a quarter of the population are the Berbers who were Arabized mainly as a result of the Arab nomad inflow, and have adopted Arab culture and the Arabic language as their native language, especially those who sought the protection of the Bedouin. A small minority of the population is identified as Haratin and Gnawa, These are sedentary agriculturalists of non-Arab and non-Berber origin, who inhabit the southern and eastern oases and speak either Berber or Arabic. Some parts of the population are descendants of refugees who fled Spain after the Reconquista in the 15th century. The Trans-Saharan slave trade brought a population of Sub-Saharan Africans to Morocco. After the founding of Israel and start of the Arab-Israeli conflict in 1948, many Jews felt compelled to leave Morocco especially after the anti-Jewish riots in Oujda, and many fled to Israel, Europe, and North America, and by 1967 250,000 Jews left Morocco.

History

Early Arab era (670–1031) 

In 670 AD, the first Arab conquest of the North African coastal plain took place under Uqba ibn Nafi, a general serving under the Umayyad Caliphate, marking the first wave of Arab migration to Morocco. Arab tribes such as Banu Muzaina migrated, and the Arab Muslims in the region had more impact on the culture of the Maghreb than the region's conquerors before and after them. The Umayyads brought their language, their system of government, and Islam to Morocco and many Berbers converted to Islam. The first independent state in the area of modern Morocco was the Emirate of Nekor, an Arab emirate in north Morocco ruling as a client state of the Umayyad Caliphate. It was founded by the Himyarite descendant Salih ibn Mansur in 710. After the outbreak of the Berber Revolt in 739, the Berbers formed other independent states such as the Emirate of Sijilmasa and the Barghawata Confederation.

After the Battle of Fakhkh in 786, Idris ibn Abdallah, who traced his ancestry back to Ali ibn Abi Talib, fled from the Arabian Peninsula to Morocco. He first went to Tangier before going to Walili and founding the Arab Idrisid dynasty in 788, ruling most of Morocco. The Idrisids established Fes as their capital and Morocco became a centre of Muslim learning and a major regional power. The Idrisids were ousted in 927 by the Fatimid Caliphate and their Miknasa allies. After Miknasa broke off relations with the Fatimids in 932, they were removed from power by the Maghrawa of Sijilmasa in 980. In 973, the Caliphate of Cordoba under the Umayyads took over parts of Morocco.

Berber dynasties (1053–1549)

From the 11th century onwards, a series of dynasties of Berber origin arose. Under the Almoravid dynasty and the Almohad dynasty dominated the Maghreb, much of present-day Spain and Portugal, and the western Mediterranean region. In the 13th and 14th centuries the Merinids held power in Morocco and strove to replicate the successes of the Almohads by military campaigns in Algeria and Iberia. They were followed by the Wattasids. In the 15th century, the Reconquista ended Muslim rule in central and southern Iberia and many Muslims and Jews fled to Morocco. Portuguese efforts to control the Atlantic coast in the 15th century did not greatly affect the interior of Morocco. According to Elizabeth Allo Isichei, "In 1520, there was a famine in Morocco so terrible that for a long time other events were dated by it. It has been suggested that the population of Morocco fell from 5 to under 3 million between the early sixteenth and nineteenth centuries."

Arab dynasties (1549–present) 

The major migration to the region by Arab tribes was in the 11th century when the tribes of Banu Hilal and Banu Sulaym, along with others, were sent by the Fatimids to defeat a Berber rebellion and then settle in the Maghreb. These tribes advanced in large numbers all the way to Morocco, contributing to a more extensive ethnic, genetic, cultural, and linguistic Arabization in the region. The Arab tribes of Maqil migrated to the Maghreb a century later and even immigrated southwards to Mauritania.

From 1549, a series of Arab dynasties arose. First the Saadian dynasty who ruled from 1549 to 1659, and then the 'Alawi dynasty, who remain in power since the 17th century. Both dynasties are Sharifian.

Under the Saadian dynasty, the country repulsed Ottoman incursions and a Portuguese invasion at the battle of Ksar el Kebir in 1578. The reign of Ahmad al-Mansur brought new wealth and prestige to the Sultanate, and a large expedition to West Africa inflicted a crushing defeat on the Songhay Empire in 1591. However, managing the territories across the Sahara proved too difficult. After the death of al-Mansur the country was divided among his sons.

In 1666, Morocco was reunited by the Arab 'Alawi dynasty, who have been the ruling house of Morocco ever since. Morocco was facing aggression from Spain and the Ottoman Empire lies pressing westward. The 'Alawis succeeded in stabilizing their position, and while the kingdom was smaller than previous ones in the region, it remained quite wealthy. Against the opposition of local tribes Ismail Ibn Sharif (1672–1727) began to create a unified state.

Morocco was the first nation to recognize the fledgling United States as an independent nation in 1777. In the beginning of the American Revolution, American merchant ships in the Atlantic Ocean were subject to attack by the Barbary pirates. On 20 December 1777, Morocco's Sultan Mohammed III declared that American merchant ships would be under the protection of the sultanate and could thus enjoy safe passage. The Moroccan-American Treaty of Friendship, signed in 1786, stands as the U.S.'s oldest non-broken friendship treaty.

Genetic composition

Culture

The culture of Morocco is a blend of Arab, Berber, Jewish, and Western European cultures. Through Moroccan history, the country had many cultural influences (Europe, Middle East and sub-Saharan Africa). The culture of Morocco shares similar traits with those of neighboring countries, particularly Algeria and Tunisia and to a certain extent Spain.

Each region possesses its own uniqueness, contributing to the national culture. Morocco has set among its top priorities the protection of its diversity and the preservation of its cultural heritage.

The traditional dress for men and women is called djellaba (جلابة), a long, loose, hooded garment with full sleeves. For special occasions, men also wear a red cap called a bernousse, more commonly known as a fez. Women wear kaftans decorated with ornaments. Nearly all men, and most women, wear balgha (بلغة). These are soft leather slippers with no heel, often dyed yellow. Women also wear high-heeled sandals, often with silver or gold tinsel.

Moroccan style is a new trend in decoration, which takes its roots from Moorish architecture. It has been made popular by the vogue of riad renovation in Marrakech. Dar is the name given to one of the most common types of domestic structures in Morocco; it is a home found in a medina, or walled urban area of a city. Dar exteriors are typically devoid of ornamentation and windows, except occasional small openings in secondary quarters, such as stairways and service areas. These piercings provide light and ventilation.
Moroccan cuisine primarily consists of a blend of Arab, Berber, and Andalusi influences. It is known for dishes like couscous and pastilla, among others. Spices such as cinnamon are also used in Moroccan cooking. Sweets like halwa are popular, as well as other confections. Cuisines from neighbouring areas have also influenced the country's culinary traditions. Additionally, Moroccan craftsmanship has a rich tradition of jewellery-making, pottery, leather-work and woodwork.

The music of Morocco ranges and differs according to the various areas of the country. Moroccan music has a variety of styles from complex sophisticated orchestral music to simple music involving only voice and drums. There are three varieties of folk music: village and ritual music, and the music performed by professional musicians. Chaabi (الشعبي) is a music consisting of numerous varieties which descend from the multifarious forms of Moroccan folk music. Chaabi was originally performed in markets, but is now found at any celebration or meeting. Gnawa is a form of music that is mystical. It was gradually brought to Morocco by the Gnawa and later became part of the Moroccan tradition. Sufi brotherhoods (tariqas) are common in Morocco, and music is an integral part of their spiritual tradition. This music is an attempt at reaching a trance state which inspires mystical ecstasy.

Languages

Morocco's official languages are Modern Standard Arabic and Berber.

The majority of the population speaks Moroccan Arabic, spoken by 92.2% of the population, 37.3 million people. 8.8 million Moroccans speak Berber varieties wish make 26% of population of Morocco, either as a first language or bilingually with Arabic. Three different Berber dialects are spoken: Tarifit, spoken by 1.27 million mostly in the Rif mountains, Shilha, spoken by 3 to 4.5 million mostly in the Anti-Atlas mountains, and Central Atlas Tamazight, spoken by 2.3 million mostly in the Middle Atlas.

Hassaniya Arabic is spoken in the southern part of the country, spoken by over 200,000 people. Morocco has recently included the protection of Hassaniya in the constitution as part of the July 2011 reforms.

French is taught universally and still serves as Morocco's primary language of commerce and economics; it is also used in education, sciences, government and most education fields.

Spanish is also spoken in the northern and southern parts of the country as a secondary foreign language after French. Meanwhile, English is increasingly becoming more popular among the educated, particularly in the science fields.

See also

Moroccan diaspora
Genetic history of the Iberian Peninsula
Expulsion of the Moriscos
List of Moroccans
Moroccan Americans

References 

Moroccan diaspora
Society of Morocco
Arabs in Morocco
Arabs
North African people
Morocco
Maghreb
North Africa